Arthur Alexander is the second studio album by Arthur Alexander, released in 1972. A 1989 UK reissue by Ace Records included two additional tracks, and an expanded edition was released in 2017 by Omnivore Recordings with six additional tracks.

Track listing 
 "I'm Comin' Home" (Dennis Linde) – 1:55
 "It Hurts to Want It So Bad" (Steve Smith, Tim Smith, Charles Feldman) – 2:17
 "Go on Home Girl" (Arthur Alexander) – 2:43
 "In the Middle of It All" (Arthur Alexander) – 3:05
 "Burning Love" (Dennis Linde) – 2:39
 "Rainbow Road" (Donnie Fritts, Dan Penn) – 3:25
 "Love's Where Life Begins" (Arthur Alexander, Dale Ward) – 2:05
 "Down the Back Roads" (Jackie Cook, Steve Cropper, Mary V. Williams) – 2:27
 "Call Me Honey" (Dennis Linde) – 2:17
 "Come Along With Me" (Arthur Alexander, Donnie Fritts) – 2:42
 "Call Me in Tahiti" (Dennis Linde) – 2:23
 "Thank God He Came" (Arthur Alexander, Donnie Fritts) – 2:54

1989 reissue bonus tracks:
 "Lover Please" (Billy Swan) – 2:42
 "They'll Do It Every Time" (Arthur Alexander, Thomas Cain) – 2:47

2017 expanded edition bonus tracks:
 "Mr. John" (Arthur Alexander, Thomas Cain)
 "You Got Me Knockin'" (Arthur Alexander, Ed Williams, Steve Hostak, Thomas Cain)
 "Lover Please" (Billy Swan)
 "They'll Do It Every Time" (Arthur Alexander, Thomas Cain)
 "I Don't Want Nobody" (previously un-issued)
 "Simple Song of Love" (previously un-issued)

Personnel 
Arthur Alexander – vocals
Bobby Wood - piano
Hayword Bishop - drums
Thomas Cain - piano
Gene Chrisman - drums
Johnny Christopher - guitar
Tommy Cogbill - bass
Shane Keister - keyboards
Bobby Emmons - keyboards
Eddie Hinton - guitar
Mike Leech - bass, string arrangements
Kenny Malone - drums
Reggie Young - guitar
Charles Chalmers - horn arrangements
Technical
Ed Thrasher - art direction
Jon Echevarrieta - design
John Donegan - photography

References

1972 albums
Arthur Alexander albums
Warner Records albums
Albums produced by Tommy Cogbill